In mathematics, especially in topology, a topological group  is said to have no small subgroup if there exists a neighborhood  of the identity that contains no nontrivial subgroup of  An abbreviation '"NSS"' is sometimes used. A basic example of a topological group with no small subgroup is the general linear group over the complex numbers.

A locally compact, separable metric, locally connected group with no small subgroup is a Lie group. (cf. Hilbert's fifth problem.)

See also

References

 M. Goto, H., Yamabe, On some properties of locally compact groups with no small group

Group theory
05
Lie groups
Topological groups